was a Japanese lyricist, composer, author, essayist, and television personality of Chinese descent.

Ei wrote the lyrics to the song "Ue o Muite Arukō", known internationally as "Sukiyaki", which has been used in several English language films. He also wrote the lyrics to the song "Miagete Goran Yoru no Hoshi o" sung by Kyu Sakamoto in 1963. He was a graduate of Waseda University.

Books
(1985) 
(1986) 
(1987) 
(1990) 
(1993) 
(1994)

TV shows
Shichiji ni aimashō

Radio programs
 TBS Radio
 TBS Radio

Lyrics
(1959) "Kuroi hanabira" ; "Black Petals"
(1961) "Ue o muite arukō" ; "Sukiyaki"
(1962) "Tōku e ikitai" ; "I want to go to far away"
(1963) "Miagete Goran Yoru no Hoshi o"
(1963) "Wakai kisetsu"
(1963) "Konnichiwa akachan"
(1965) "Kaerokana"
(1979) "Hajimete no machi de"

References

External links 

books by Rokusuke Ei at Amazon.com
Information about use of the song "Sukiyaki" in films
Recording of song "Sukiyaki"
Music by Rokusuke Ei

1933 births
2016 deaths
Japanese radio personalities
Japanese writers
Japanese essayists
Japanese people of Chinese descent
Writers from Tokyo
Waseda University alumni